Bill Hilf is the Chief Executive Officer (CEO) of Vulcan Inc. He was appointed CEO on 2 December 2016, succeeding Paul Allen. Before becoming CEO of Vulcan Inc., he was the Senior Vice President and General Manager at Hewlett-Packard Enterprise's Cloud business unit, where he was responsible for engineering, product management, and product marketing. Prior to HPE, Bill spent ten years at Microsoft in a variety of leadership roles.

Career

IBM 
At IBM, Hilf was a senior software architect and helped to build the company's Open-source strategy in the early 2000s. According to Wired, “IBM was one of the first companies to realize the benefits of software that anyone can use and modify for free.”

Microsoft 
Hilf was then recruited by Microsoft in 2004 to help the company understand and work with the open-source software community. While at Microsoft, Hilf worked in a variety of leadership roles, including Windows Server and helping to build the company's cloud service, Microsoft Azure. Hilf was instrumental in architecting Microsoft's early open-source strategy. For this work, he was recognized as one of the 25 most influential people at the company.

Hewlett-Packard 
In 2013, Hilf joined HP with the goal of helping the company become “the world’s best provider for enterprises who want to build hybrid clouds” according to Wired. As its senior vice president, Hilf led the HP Cloud Research and Development and business operations. In 2016, the company underwent an organizational shift and announced Hilf was leaving the company to “pursue new opportunities.” In an email to GeekWire, Hilf wrote, “For me personally, when I joined, I made a commitment to build the cloud business here at HP for three years, and I’m now 3 years and one month in, and we have had very strong growth – just this past June HPE Helion was recognized as a leader in the private cloud market for the third year in a row.  So this is the right time for me to help move the technologies and teams more deeply into the company, and to pursue new opportunities.”

Vulcan Inc. 
In December 2016, Microsoft co-founder Paul Allen hired Hilf as CEO of his company, Vulcan Inc. In this role, he is tasked with guiding the company's diverse commercial and philanthropic endeavors—from capital investment and real estate to tackling climate change to promoting access to arts and culture among others.

Philanthropy

High Five Hope 
On a business trip to the Philippines for Microsoft in 2008, Hilf came across kids playing basketball on the streets with rags wrapped into a ball. As a former basketball player and amateur coach himself, he joined in. That experience led him to think about using sports as a tool to help kids. In 2008, Hilf launched High Five Hope, a non-profit aimed at “bringing the power of structured, supportive sports programs to street children in the Philippines. Initially, focused on basketball, High Five Hope has expanded to include a variety of sports like girls’ volleyball and futkal—a type of street soccer.

Microsoft 
In his years at Microsoft, Hilf served as the company's executive sponsor to the United Nations High Commissioner for Refugees (UNHCR), helping to build computer labs in refugee camps.  He was also a divisional leader for the Microsoft “Give” campaigns.

References

Further reading

 
 
  — Background of Hilf's creation of High Five Hope
 
 
 

Microsoft employees
IBM employees
Year of birth missing (living people)
Living people